Mbunde Cumba Mbali (born April 25, 1991) is a Bissau-Guinean freestyle wrestler.  He is three time African Championships winner (in 2019, 2020 and 2022) at the Freestyle 65 kg category.

Major results

References

External links 
 

1991 births
Living people
Bissau-Guinean male sport wrestlers
Competitors at the 2019 African Games
African Games silver medalists for Guinea-Bissau
African Games medalists in wrestling
African Wrestling Championships medalists
Islamic Solidarity Games medalists in wrestling